Prienai District Municipality is one of 60 municipalities in Lithuania.

References

Municipalities of Kaunas County
Municipalities of Lithuania